Giles Brydges, 3rd Baron Chandos of Sudeley (c. 1548 – 21 February 1594) was an English courtier in the reign of Elizabeth I.

Life
He was born at Sudeley Manor, Gloucestershire, the son of Edmund Brydges, 2nd Baron Chandos and his wife Hon. Dorothy Bray. Brydges was Member of Parliament for Cricklade in 1571 and for Gloucestershire from 1572 to 1573. He succeeded his father as 3rd Baron Chandos of Sudeley on 11 March 1573 and held the office of Lord-Lieutenant of Gloucestershire in 1586. He entertained Queen Elizabeth at Sudeley Castle in 1592.

Chandos died on 21 February 1594 without male issue and was therefore succeeded by his brother William who became the fourth Baron Chandos of Sudeley. He is buried in the Chapel of St. Mary at Sudeley Castle in Winchcombe, England.

Family
He married Lady Frances Clinton (Scrivelsby, Lincolnshire, 1553 - Woburn Abbey, Bedfordshire, 12 September 1623), daughter of Edward Clinton, 1st Earl of Lincoln and his second wife Ursula Stourton before 1573. According to Joan Barbara Greenbaum Goldsmith's unpublished PhD dissertation, All the Queen's Women: the changing place and perception of aristocratic women in Elizabethan England, 1558-1620, Frances and her husband separated during the 1590s. She died at Woburn Abbey, home of her daughter Catherine, Countess of Bedford.

They had four children of whom only two daughters survived:
 Elizabeth Brydges (c. 1578–1617), Maid of Honour to Elizabeth I, married Sir John Kennedy. She died without issue.
 Catherine Brydges (c. 1580–1656/7), married Francis Russell, 4th Earl of Bedford and had issue.
 John Brydges, died young.
 Charles Brydges, died young.

Portraits of Chandos, his wife, and his daughter Elizabeth by Hieronimo Custodis are in the collection of the Duke of Bedford at Woburn Abbey.

Notes

References
 Hearn, Karen, ed. Dynasties: Painting in Tudor and Jacobean England 1530-1630.  New York: Rizzoli, 1995.  .
 

|-

|-

English courtiers
1540s births
1594 deaths
Brydges
Lord-Lieutenants of Gloucestershire
People from Winchcombe
English MPs 1571
English MPs 1572–1583
16th-century English nobility
Members of the Parliament of England (pre-1707) for Cricklade
Gi
Burials at St Mary's Chapel, Sudeley Castle
3
Court of Elizabeth I